Anandita Dutta Tamuly (Assamese: আনন্দিতা দত্ত তামুলী), maiden name Anandita Dutta, is an Assamese woman from Titabor Town in Jorhat district of Assam. She is married to Pankaj Tamuly and is mother of a son. She is known for eating and rubbing Bhut Jolokia peppers on her bare eyes.  The chilli, native to Assam, is the world's second-hottest chilli pepper.

Childhood effect
When Anandita was five, she had a sore tongue and her mother applied a chilli paste to cure the infection. Since then she developed a penchant for chillies. While children of her age roamed the village looking for berries, she used to look for Bhut Jolokia pepper which she ate with salt.

Making records
In 2006, Anandita had entered the Limca Book of Records by eating 60 ghost chillies in two minutes and smearing 12 chillies in her eyes in one minute flat. Since then she has practised this in an attempt to enter the Guinness World Records by beating South Africa’s Anita Crafford, who created a record by eating eight jalapenos in a minute in 2002.

In reality shows
Anandita's chilli eating was aired on Zee TV's reality show Shabaash India on August 29, 2006.

Towards Guinness Records

On Thursday night, April 9, 2009, Anandita performed her feat at the district library auditorium, Jorhat before hundreds of people for a Channel 4 programme on global food being anchored by celebrity British chef Gordon Ramsay. She ate 51 red-hot chillies in two minutes and smeared seeds of 25 chillies in her eyes without shedding a tear. According to Diganta Saikia, one of the event coordinators, the Guinness authorities had earlier asked them to authenticate this with a supervised recording of the feat. The coordinators accordingly asked Ramsay to be the adjudicator for Guinness and he agreed to pursue Anandita’s claim as the world's 'hottest woman' by submitting video clippings.

References

External links
Indian in record chilli attempt, BBC News.
Woman aims for record feast of world's hottest pepper ABC News.

People from Assam
People from Jorhat district
Living people
Year of birth missing (living people)